Mir Sabbir is a Bangladeshi actor and director. He was born at Barguna is a district of Barisal division. He stayed and studied at Barguna up to Higher Secondary Level. He Passed HSC from Barguna Degree College. After Passing HSC he moved to dhaka and Joined University. During his University period he joined Theatre.

Career
In 1999, Sabbir debuted his television acting career in the drama Putro.

Sabbir debuted his television drama direction in Barisal Bonam Noakhali and drama-serial direction in Maqbul."Noashal" is a very popular Television drama serial directed by Mir Sabbir.

Personal life
Sabbir is married to actress Farzana Chumki since 2003.

Works

Film
 Ki Jadu Korila (2008)
 Valobasha Emoni Hoy (2016)

Natok
 Noashal 
 Prem Nagor 
 Aladin
 Parajaboti Mon 
 Patorer Kanna 
 Baap Beta Dewana 
 Baap Beta Duyer Upar 
 Baap Beta Biye (2018) Etc.

Director
 Raat Jaga Phool (2021)

References

External links

Living people
Bangladeshi male film actors
Bangladeshi male television actors
Bangladeshi television directors
People from Barguna district
Year of birth missing (living people)